José Nicolás González (born 24 February 1999) is an Argentina boliviano professional footballer who plays as a winger for Defensa y Justicia.

Career
González started with River Plate de Embarcación at the age of eight, before departing at the age of fourteen to Mitre de Salta. He was part of the latter's squad that prepared for the 2015 Torneo Federal B campaign, though he left during pre-season in order to trial at Racing Club; after receiving a travel ticket from his parents for his birthday, which allowed him to make use of a contact his aunt had with the Avellaneda club. He remained for more than a year, prior to joining Defensa y Justicia in 2017. Having scored in a Huracán friendly in 2019, González was promoted into the first-team in late-2020 under Hernán Crespo.

After appearing as an unused substitute three times, González's senior debut arrived on 29 November 2020 as he replaced Juan Cruz Villagra after sixty-one minutes of a Copa de la Liga Profesional 3–2 loss at home to Central Córdoba; he assisted Defensa's second goal.

Career statistics
.

Notes

References

External links

1999 births
Living people
Sportspeople from Salta Province
Argentine footballers
Association football midfielders
Argentine Primera División players
Defensa y Justicia footballers